David Miller (born 11 April 1961) is a Canadian judoka who represented Canada in the 1995 World Judo Championships. He is currently the head instructor of the Annex Judo Academy, located in the Annex neighbourhood of Toronto, Ontario, which he founded in 1997, and has taught judo and physical education at Royal St. George's College since 1999. Miller began practising judo in 1972 and later spent significant time studying judo in Japan, including 9 years at Tokai University under Nobuyuki Sato and Yasuhiro Yamashita.

See also
Judo in Ontario
Judo in Canada
List of Canadian judoka

References

Further reading
 

Canadian male judoka
1961 births
Living people
Sportspeople from North York